Agni is a Hindu deity.

Agni may also refer to:

Places
 Karasahr, originally known as Agni or Ārśi, an ancient city in Xinjiang, China
 Agni, Karnataka, a panchayat village in Shorapur Taluka, Yadgir District, Karnataka, India
 398188 Agni, an asteroid

Popular culture
 Agni (1978 film), an Indian Malayalam-language film
 Agni (1989 film), an Indian Telugu-language action film
 Agni (2004 film), Indian Bengali-language film
 Agnee (2014 film), or Agni, a Bangladeshi Bengali-language film 
 Agni (Black Butler character), a character in the manga and anime series Black Butler
 Agni, a member of the Onslaught (DC Comics) team of terrorists
 HMS Agni, an Apollo class light cruiser, commanded by Michelle Henke, in the Honorverse series
 Agni Kai, a firebending duel in Avatar: The Last Airbender; see The Last Airbender Prequel: Zuko's Story
 Agni, a fire-themed sword in the video game Devil May Cry 3: Dante's Awakening
 Agni, the protagonist and main character of the manga Fire Punch
 Agni, God of Fire in the 1968 novel Lord of Light by Roger Zelazny

People
 Agni or Anyi people in southwest Ghana and southeast Ivory Coast
 Agni Vlavianos Arvanitis (1936–2018), American biologist
 Agni Pratistha (born 1987), actress and beauty queen, Miss Indonesia 2006
 Agni Shridhar, Kannada former gangster, writer, critic and film director
 Agni Mitra, Shunga emperor in ancient India, son of Pushyamitra Shunga
 Malavik Agnimitra, ancient Indian drama by Kālidāsa based on his marriage with Malvika

Other uses
 Advocate General for Northern Ireland
 Agni (Ayurveda), the "fire" that drives all digestion and metabolism in the Hindu medical practice of Ayurveda
 AGNI (magazine), an American literary magazine
 Agni (missile), a family of medium to intercontinental range ballistic missiles developed by India
 Agni (opera), a 2007 opera in Sinhalese by Premasiri Khemadasa, libretto by Eric Illayapparachchi
 Cyclone Agni, a 2004 tropical cyclone
 Agni Air, a defunct airline in Nepal
 Agni Motors, a manufacturer of high-efficiency electric motors
 Agni Energy, a startup developing a nuclear fusion reactor
 Team Agni, a TTXGP racing team
 Agni or Anyin language, spoken principally in Ivory Coast and Ghana
 Agni, the third chakra (group) of Melakarta ragas in Carnatic music
 Agne or Agni, an early king of Sweden in Norse mythology
 Attorney General for Northern Ireland

See also

 
 Agnee (disambiguation)
 Agnes (disambiguation)
 Agni Poolu (disambiguation) including "Agni Pulu"